Egidio Caporello (8 June 1931 – 18 July 2022) was an Italian prelate of the Catholic Church. 

Caporello was ordained to the priesthood in 1955. He served in the Roman Curia from 1982 to 1986 and was ordained titular bishop of Caprulae. Caporello then served as bishop of Diocese of Mantua, Italy, from 1986 until his retirement in 2007.

References

1931 births
2022 deaths
Bishops of Mantua
Bishops appointed by Pope John Paul II
Pontifical Gregorian University alumni
20th-century Roman Catholic bishops
21st-century Roman Catholic bishops
People from Pavia